Ren'ai or Renai may refer to:

 Ren'ai, Nantou, a township in Nantou County, Taiwan
 Ren-ai District, of the city of Keelung, Taiwan
 Renai Medicity, a hospital in Kochi, Kerala, India

 Ren'ai adventure game, a romance-themed subgenre of adventure game
 Ren'ai simulation game, a romance-themed subgenre of life simulation game also known as a dating sim
 Ren'ai Circulation, the 4th opening song in the anime Bakemonogatari
 Ren'ai Shoal in South China Sea

See also